Fabro is a comune (municipality) in the Province of Terni in the Italian region Umbria, located about 40 km southwest of Perugia and about 60 km northwest of Terni.

Fabro borders the following municipalities: Allerona, Cetona, Città della Pieve, Ficulle, Montegabbione, Monteleone d'Orvieto, San Casciano dei Bagni.

Main sights
Castle of Fabro
Castle of Carnaiola
Church of St. Martin of Tours in Fabro
Church of San Severo e Salvatore in Carnaiola

References

Cities and towns in Umbria